Choe Myong-gwang (born 7 January 1990) is a North Korean alpine skier. He competed in the 2018 Winter Olympics.

References

1990 births
Living people
Alpine skiers at the 2018 Winter Olympics
North Korean male alpine skiers
Olympic alpine skiers of North Korea